The California Governor's Mansion is the official residence of the governor of California, located in Sacramento, the capital of California. Built in 1877, the estate was purchased by the Californian government in 1903 and has served as the executive residence for 14 governors. The mansion was occupied by governors between 1903–1967 and 2015–2019. Since 1967, the mansion has been managed by California State Parks as the Governor's Mansion State Historic Park.

History 

The thirty-room, three-story Second Empire-Italianate Victorian mansion was built in 1877 for local hardware merchant Albert Gallatin, who sold it to businessman Joseph Steffens, the father of journalist Lincoln Steffens, in 1887. In 1903, the State of California purchased the house to serve as the governor's mansion.

Many furnishings remain from former governors, including Pardee's 1902 Steinway piano, velvet chairs, and sofas belonging to Governor Hiram Johnson, and Persian rugs bought by the wife of Earl Warren.

State park
In 1967, ownership of the mansion was transferred from the Governor of California to California State Parks, establishing the Governor's Mansion California State Historic Park. Governor Reagan lived in the mansion for a few months while making arrangements for his own residence. He leased a home in East Sacramento's "Fabulous 40s" neighborhood at 1341 45th Street. Reagan set a precedent that was adopted by all subsequent California governors until 2015.

In 1970, the mansion was designated as a "historic house museum" and opened to the public.

From 1974 to 1975, during Reagan's tenure, a new executive mansion was constructed in the Casa de los Gobernadores neighborhood of Carmichael, a suburb of Sacramento. Reagan never resided in the mansion, as it was completed after his tenure as governor ended, and the mansion was subsequently sold by Reagan's successor, Jerry Brown. Brown, during his first two terms as governor from 1975 to 1983, lived in a sparsely-furnished two-bedroom apartment at the Dean Apartments at 1400 N St. 

Governors George Deukmejian, Pete Wilson, and Gray Davis all lived in different Carmichael residences. Governor Arnold Schwarzenegger ordinarily commuted each day by private plane from his home in the Brentwood area of Los Angeles. When he would need to stay in Sacramento overnight, he would take a hotel suite at the Hyatt Regency Sacramento which is across the street from the California State Capitol.

When Brown became governor again in 2011, he opted to live in a  downtown loft.

In July 2012, the Governor's Mansion was one of 70 California State Parks proposed for closure as part of a deficit reduction program. Previously, it was also one of several state parks threatened with closure in 2008. These threatened closures were ultimately avoided by cutting hours and maintenance system-wide.

Renewed executive residence
In 2015, the mansion once again became the official residence of the governor of California as well as being a museum, when Governor Jerry Brown and his wife, Anne Gust Brown, moved into the governor's mansion after it underwent $4.1 million in renovations to update electrical and plumbing systems, as well as to remove lead-based paint and install a fire sprinkler system and other security features.

In 2019, Governor Gavin Newsom and his family lived briefly in the mansion before taking up residence in a house purchased in the Sacramento suburb of Fair Oaks.

Stanford Mansion

The Leland Stanford Mansion, the former residence of Leland Stanford (8th Governor of California and founder of Stanford University), serves as the official reception house for the Californian government. It is often used by the governor for official receptions of foreign dignitaries and for ceremonial purposes.

The Stanford Mansion also hosts an official office and working space for the governor.

Casa de los Gobernadores mansion 
During 1974–1975, a new Governor's Mansion was built at 2300 California Avenue in the Casa de los Gobernadores neighborhood of Carmichael, a Sacramento suburb.() It was a one-story, hacienda-style, 11,984 square foot single-family home, 17 rooms with 8 bedrooms and 8 bathrooms. It is built on an 11.3-acre parcel that has a view of the American River; the parcel was donated by friends of Governor Reagan.

Reagan never resided in this new governor's mansion as it was completed after his term ended. Jerry Brown, who succeeded Reagan, refused to live in the mansion. In 1982, the erstwhile governor's mansion was sold by the state. It is now a private residence with no connection to the California state government.

See also 
 Governor of California
 Stanford Mansion
 History of Sacramento, California
 National Register of Historic Places listings in Sacramento County, California
 California Historical Landmarks in Sacramento County, California

References

Further reading 
 
 Joan Didion. (1979). "Many Mansions" in The White Album. New York: Simon and Schuster.

External links 

 Official Governor's Mansion State Historic Park website
 Parks.ca.gov: Online tour of the Historic Governor's Mansion
 Visiting... with Huell Howser Episode 417 features a tour of the mansion by Kathleen Brown

Official residences in California
California State Historic Parks
Museums in Sacramento, California
Historic house museums in California
California
Houses completed in 1877
Houses in Sacramento County, California
California Historical Landmarks
Houses on the National Register of Historic Places in California
Government buildings on the National Register of Historic Places in California
National Register of Historic Places in Sacramento, California
Landmarks in Sacramento, California
Parks in Sacramento County, California
Protected areas established in 1970
Italianate architecture in California
Second Empire architecture in California
Victorian architecture in California
1970 establishments in California
Gilded Age mansions